Crazy Cukkad Family is a 2015 Bollywood comedy film directed by Ritesh Menon and produced by Prakash Jha. The film stars Swanand Kirkire, Shilpa Shukla, Zachary Coffin, Nora Fatehi, Kushal Punjabi, Jugnu Ishiqui, Jagat Singh and Anushka Sen. Upon release the movie received mixed to positive responses. Rajkumar Hirani, Sudhir Mishra and Gauri Shinde praised the performances and the story.

Plot
This roller coaster ride begins with the Wealthy Mr. Beri slipping into his third Coma. His four estranged children have to make it back home to be there while their father "hopefully" breathes his last, leaving behind his huge estate in the mountains.

Pawan Beri, the oldest child of Mr. & Mrs Beri, is a hustler who is in big trouble with a local mafia don turned Politician. Rude, brash, and arrogant, he looks at everything from his own crooked view. Archana Beri is a wannabe socialite and former Miss India hopeful, forced to give up her dreams after an arranged marriage at a young age. She is bitter towards the entire world, including her family, and bullies her meek husband Digvijay who in secret has a dual personality. Aman Beri is the New York-based son who returns with his American wife, Amy who meets the family for the first time. He pretends to be a top fashion photographer, but is actually struggling and unemployed. Abhay "Chotu" Beri is the youngest in the family. Not much is known about his present status. Years ago he was sent to New Zealand to study, but has returned only now.

Along with the four siblings are a bunch of other unique and eccentric characters like a village item girl, an extra slow family lawyer, and 3 goofy investigators. The chaos begins when they discover that in order to open the will, they need to get 'Chotu' married. Set in a lush green, picturesque hill station, this story is about the dysfunctional Beri family. A mad-caper but true to life, hilarious but emotional, fast paced yet heartwarming story of a family estranged for years, brought together by greed but eventually finding each other, discovering the true meaning of being a family.

Cast
 Swanand Kirkire as Pawan Beri 
 Shilpa Shukla as Archana Berry
 Kushal Punjabi as Aman Beri
 Siddharth Sharma as Abhay Beri/ Chotu
 Pravina Deshpande
 Kiran Karmarkar
 Yusuf Hussain
 Ninad Kamat
 Nora Fatehi as Amy
 Vikrant Soni as Mony Beri 
 Jagat Singh as Lakhan
 Zachary Coffin
 Jugnu Ishiqui as Cherry
 Dev Dhakal
 Anushka Sen

Soundtrack 

The soundtrack for the album was composed by Sidharth Suhaas and lyrics were penned by Kumaar.

References

External links
 

2010s Hindi-language films
Indian comedy films
2015 comedy films
Hindi-language comedy films